Matthew Jonathan Rosseinsky FRS is Professor of Inorganic Chemistry at the University of Liverpool. He was awarded the Hughes Medal in 2011 "for his influential discoveries in the synthetic chemistry of solid state electronic materials and novel microporous structures."

He has been awarded the Harrison Memorial Prize (1991), Corday-Morgan Medal and Prize (2000) and Tilden Lectureship (2006) of the Royal Society of Chemistry (RSC). In 2009, he was awarded the inaugural De Gennes Prize by the RSC, a lifetime achievement award in materials chemistry, open internationally. In 2013, he became a Royal Society Research Professor.

In 2017, he was awarded the Davy Medal of the Royal Society for “his advances in the design and discovery of functional materials, integrating the development of new experimental and computational techniques.” He gave the Muetterties Lectures at UC Berkeley and the Lee Lectures at the University of Chicago in 2017.

He was a member of the Science Minister’s Advanced Materials Leadership Council from 2014-2016, and of the governing Council of the Engineering and Physical Sciences Research Council from 2015-2019.

References

Living people
20th-century chemists
21st-century chemists
Fellows of the Royal Society
Year of birth missing (living people)
Place of birth missing (living people)
Academics of the University of Liverpool
Alumni of the University of Oxford
Solid state chemists